A dubbeltje is a small former Dutch coin, originally made of silver, with a value of a tenth of a Dutch guilder. The 10-euro-cent coin is currently also called a dubbeltje in the Netherlands.

The name "dubbeltje" is the diminutive form of the Dutch word "dubbel" (Dutch for "double") because it was worth two stuivers. When the decimal system came to the Netherlands (about 1800) the 10-cent coin was named a "dubbeltje".

In Dutch slang, a dubbeltje was named a beisje, from Dutch-Yiddish beis, the value of two stuivers.

The central opening in a CD is exactly the size of a dubbeltje. Joop Sinjou, head of Philips audio products development, said that "De snelste beslissing in de ontwikkelingsfase was over de diameter van het gat in de CD. Ik legde een dubbeltje op tafel en dat werd de maat." ("The fastest decision in the development phase was about the diameter of the hole in the CD. I put a dubbeltje on the table and that was the size.")

There are Dutch sayings about the dubbeltje:
Dat was een dubbeltje op zijn kant (That was a dubbeltje on its edge): A narrow escape.
Voor een dubbeltje op de eerste rij/rang (willen) zitten (To (want to) sit on the first row/rank for a dubbeltje): He gets (or wants to get) more for his money than he would expect from the price paid.
Wie voor een dubbeltje geboren is, wordt nooit een kwartje: If you're born poor, you'll never become rich.
Zo plat als een dubbeltje: Really thin/flat.

Automatic translation from Dutch to English often translates "dubbeltje" as "dime".

Dimensions and weight

Source

Versions

Source

References

Coins of the Netherlands
Guilder
Ten-cent coins